Hylaeus episcopalis is a species of hymenopteran in the family Colletidae. It is found in North America.

Subspecies
These three subspecies belong to the species Hylaeus episcopalis:
 Hylaeus episcopalis coquilletti (Cockerell, 1896)
 Hylaeus episcopalis episcopalis (Cockerell, 1896)
 Hylaeus episcopalis giffardiellus Cockerell, 1925
 Hylaeus episcopalis metzi Snelling, 1966

References

Further reading

 

Colletidae
Articles created by Qbugbot
Insects described in 1896